Albert Town is a town in the parish of Trelawny in Jamaica.

References 

Populated places in Trelawny Parish